The All-Ireland Under 21 Football Championship is an under 21 Gaelic football inter county competition between the 32 counties of Ireland. Four competitions are contested in each province and the winners of each provincial championship enters the all-Ireland series.

Leinster Under 21 Championship

Round 1

Quarter finals

Semi finals

Final

Ulster Under 21 Football Championship

Preliminary round

Quarter-final

Semi-final

Final

Munster Under 21 Football Championship

Quarter-final

Semi-final

Final

Connacht Under 21 Football Championship

Quarter-final

Semi-final

Final

All-Ireland Semi Series

External links
Official Website

Recerences

All-Ireland Under-21 Football Championships
All-Ireland Under 21 Football Championship